This list contains an overview of the government recognized Cultural Properties of the Philippines in Mimaropa. The list is based on the official lists provided by the National Commission on Culture and the Arts, National Historical Commission of the Philippines and the National Museum of the Philippines.

|}

See also
List of historical markers of the Philippines in Mimaropa
List of Cultural Properties of the Philippines in Pinamalayan, Oriental Mindoro

Mimaropa
Cultural Properties